Actinolepis is an extinct genus of actinolepid placoderm from the Early Devonian. Four species are known: A. magna from Estonia, A. spinosa from Latvia (Sevy Dolomite), the type species A. tuberculata from New Zealand (Adam Mudstone Formation) and A. zaikai from Belarus (Lepel Beds).

Gallery

References 

Devonian placoderms
Arthrodires
Placoderm families
Early Devonian first appearances
Early Devonian extinctions